Copper carbonate may refer to :

Copper (II) compounds and minerals
 Copper(II) carbonate proper,  (neutral copper carbonate): a rarely seen moisture-sensitive compound.
 Basic copper carbonate (the "copper carbonate" of commerce), actually a copper carbonate hydroxide; which may be either
2: the green mineral malachite, verdigris, the pigment "green verditer" or "mountain green"
2()2: the blue mineral azurite, and the pigment "blue verditer" or "mountain blue"
Lapis armenus, a precious stone, a basic copper carbonate from Armenia
Marklite, a hydrated copper carbonate mineral

Copper (I) compounds
 Copper(I) carbonate, Cu2CO3